The Wellman Building, also known as the Wellman Block, is a historic commercial building located at Jamestown in Chautauqua County, New York.  It consists of an 1897 masonry bearing wall structure and a steel frame  structure built in 1910.  The 1897 building is a five-story, Renaissance Revival brick building.  The 1910 addition retains the Renaissance Revival style.  The building originally housed a druggist and stationery store on the first floor, with offices on the upper floors.

It was listed on the National Register of Historic Places in 2009.

References

Renaissance Revival architecture in New York (state)
Commercial buildings completed in 1897
Commercial buildings on the National Register of Historic Places in New York (state)
Buildings and structures in Chautauqua County, New York
National Register of Historic Places in Chautauqua County, New York